This is a complete list of the properties and districts on the National Register of Historic Places in Rocky Mountain National Park, Colorado, United States.  The locations of National Register properties and districts for which the latitude and longitude coordinates are included below, may be seen in a Google map.

There are 48 properties and districts listed on the National Register in the park, one of which is a National Historic Landmark.

Current listings 

|}

Former listings

|}

See also 
 Architects of the National Park Service
 National Register of Historic Places listings in Boulder County, Colorado
 National Register of Historic Places listings in Grand County, Colorado
 National Register of Historic Places listings in Larimer County, Colorado
 List of National Historic Landmarks in Colorado
 National Register of Historic Places listings in Colorado

References 
National Register of Historic Places Inventory - Nomination Form: Multiple Resource Nomination for Rocky Mountain National Park. National Park Service 1987 
Standish, Sierra. National Register of Historic Places Multiple Property Documentation Form: Rocky Mountain National Park MPS (additional documentation - trails). National Park Service September 27, 2004